Ashtar Ausaf Ali (born 19 June 1956) is a Pakistani lawyer who twice served as the Attorney General for Pakistan from 2016 to 2018, and from 2022 to 2023. In his first term, he co-drafted the Twenty-Fifth Amendment to the Constitution of Pakistan, which merged the Federally Administered Tribal Areas with Khyber Pakhtunkhwa.

Ausaf previously served as Special Assistant to the Prime Minister on Law and Justice from 2015 to 2016, twice as Advocate General of Punjab from 1998 to 1999 and 2012 to 2013, and as Prosecutor General of the province from 2011 to 2012. 

His daughter was the chef Fatima Ali, who died of cancer in 2019, at the age of 29.

Early life and education
Ausaf was born in Lahore, Pakistan, the eldest son of lawyer and diplomat Iftikhar Ali Sheikh. He completed his Bachelor of Arts from Forman Christian College in 1975, and his LLB from Punjab University in 1980, where he also taught as adjunct lecturer for international law from 1984 to 1988. He became a member of the Lahore Bar Association in 1980, and was awarded an MCL from George Washington University, where he was a member of the Phi Delta Phi legal fraternity.

Legal career
Ausaf came to prominence in the 1990s as a litigator and constitutional lawyer. After President Ghulam Ishaq Khan dismissed the government of Prime Minister Nawaz Sharif in 1993, he successfully represented Sharif before the Supreme Court of Pakistan against the dissolution of parliament. The Supreme Court overturned the dismissal, and Sharif was re-elected in 1997. Ausaf was then appointed Advisor to the Prime Minister on human rights. He was appointed Advocate General of Punjab in May 1998, but resigned from his post when General Pervez Musharraf overthrew the Sharif government in a military coup.

Detention during emergency rule
Ausaf supported the Lawyers' Movement for the restoration of an independent judiciary. After Musharraf declared a state of emergency in 2007, Ausaf was detained by the military regime from the Lahore office of the Human Rights Commission of Pakistan on 5 November 2007. He suffered a heart attack in custody and was hospitalised.

Advocate General Punjab
Following general elections in 2008, General Musharraf resigned as President. The Pakistan Muslim League (Nawaz) formed the provincial government in Punjab, and Ausaf was appointed Prosecutor General of the province in 2011, before again being appointed Advocate General on 2 January 2012, having first served at the post 14 years ago. He stepped down when the caretaker government took over for the 2013 elections, and resumed private practice at his law firm, Ashtar Ali & Co.

Escape from gun attack
On 29 June 2013, Ausaf's convoy came across two armed dacoits robbing a woman in Garden Town, Lahore. Ausaf ordered his guards to intervene, upon which the dacoits opened fire on Ausaf's car. Ausaf was unharmed. After fleeing the scene, the dacoits were arrested from Band Road.

Special Assistant to the Prime Minister
Following Pakistan Muslim League (Nawaz)'s victory in the general elections in 2013, Ausaf was appointed to Prime Minister Sharif's cabinet as Special Assistant to the Prime Minister on Law, with the status of Minister of State, on 25 February 2015, and handed charge of the Ministry of Law and Justice.

Attorney-General for Pakistan

First tenure (2016–2018)
Ausaf was appointed the 29th Attorney-General for Pakistan in a cabinet reshuffle on 29 March 2016, following the resignation of Salman Aslam Butt, with Zahid Hamid reappointed Minister for Law and Justice in Ausaf's place. As Attorney-General, he co-drafted the Twenty-Fifth Amendment to the Constitution of Pakistan, which merged the Federally Administered Tribal Areas with Khyber Pakhtunkhwa province.

He resigned on 20 June 2018 stating the need to ensure free and fair elections, and a smooth democratic transition.

Second tenure (2022–2023)
Ausaf returned as AG on 9 May 2022, when President Arif Alvi approved his appointment on the advice of Prime Minister Shehbaz Sharif. Ausaf tendered his resignation in October, citing severe health issues, and recovering from surgery. Sharif directed him to continue in office until the government named his replacement. His resignation was formally accepted on 19 January 2023, after the designated Attorney General, Mansoor Usman Awan, recused himself from the post.

References

|-

|-

|-

1956 births
People from Lahore
20th-century Pakistani lawyers
Pakistan Muslim League (N) politicians
Forman Christian College alumni
Punjab University Law College alumni
Academic staff of the University of the Punjab
George Washington University Law School alumni
Recipients of Sitara-i-Imtiaz
Shooting survivors
Living people
21st-century Pakistani lawyers
Attorneys General of Pakistan